Catherine Mary Rotella (born March 4, 1964) is an American politician who served in the Connecticut House of Representatives representing the 43rd district in New London County.

Political career

Election
Rotella was elected in the general election on November 6, 2018, winning 55 percent of the vote over 45 percent of Republican candidate Shaun Mastroianna.

References

 Connecticut Democrats
Rotella, Kate 
Living people
21st-century American politicians
21st-century American women politicians
Women state legislators in Connecticut
1964 births